Kaluwas is a village in the Bhiwani district of the Indian state of Haryana. , the village had 455 households with a total population of 2,259 of which 1,215 were male and 1,044 female.

References

Villages in Bhiwani district